Beauty & the Pink is an EP by American singer and billboard model Angelyne released in 2000 by Orbital Traxx. The EP is produced by Peter Stensland, Dan Kapelovitz and John Galvin with songs written by Angelyne. It contains two songs and a remixed version of "You Gotta Move".

Track listing

Credits
Angelyne – vocals

Production
Producers: Peter Stensland, Dan Kapelovitz, John Galvin
Engineers: Rob Hess, Peter Stensland, John Galvin, Chuck Hohn

Design
Photography: Larry Lombardi
Artistic layout: Schroeder

Special thanks
Secret Agent "Scott Hennig", Larry Lombardi, David S. Bider, Rob Hess, Laura Hess, Schroeder, David Gartrell, Don Haycock, Rick Witsoe, Clint Catalyst, Audrey Sherwood, Scott Freeson, Rob Morrison

External links 
 

Angelyne albums
2000 EPs